Kirschenbaum is a German surname of Lutheran or Ashkenazic origin meaning "cherry tree", written Kirschbaum in modern German (Kirschen means "cherries"; Baum means "tree"). It is uncommon as a given name. It was a common name that Jewish Refugees gave themselves during the 1940s when evading prosecution in Germany.

An orthographic variation of the name is Kirshenbaum.

People named Kirschenbaum or Kirshenbaum include:
 Alan Kirschenbaum, American television producer and writer
 Binnie Kirshenbaum, American novelist and short story writer
 Faina Kirschenbaum, Israeli politician
 Marc Kirschenbaum, American origami artist
 Moti Kirschenbaum, Israeli media personality and documentarian 
 Sheril Kirshenbaum, American science writer 
 Susan Kirshenbaum, American television writer 

German-language surnames
Jewish surnames
Yiddish-language surnames